Vogelpark Turnersee is a large bird park near Turnersee in Sankt Kanzian am Klopeiner See, Carinthia, Austria.

History 
Vogelpark Turnersee was opened by the Zupanc family in 1982. The park exhibits a large collection of over 1000 exotic and rare birds in over 340 species from all over the world. In 1988 the Zoo opened a small section with exotic mammals. The speciality of the park is that the birds can be fed with seeds purchased at the entrance. The park also has a buffet area and a souvenir shop and is accessible also for disabled people.

References

External links 
 

Tourist attractions in Carinthia (state)
Zoos in Austria
Bird parks
Buildings and structures in Carinthia (state)
1982 establishments in Austria
Amusement parks in Austria
Zoos established in 1982
Amusement parks opened in 1982